Odo or Eudes of Châteauroux ( –25 January 1273), also known as  and by many other names, was a French theologian and scholastic philosopher, papal legate and cardinal. He was “an experienced preacher and promoter of crusades”. Over 1000 of his sermons survive.

Life
Odo was born at Châteauroux around the year 1190.

He preached murderous crusade in 1226. He was chancellor of the University of Paris 1238-1244, and perhaps also Cistercian abbot of Ourscamp, and then abbot of Grandselve. Odo of Ourscamp is a different figure, of the twelfth century. However, several sources deny, doubt or ignore that he was a monk.

He was involved in the aftermath of the Paris disputation of 1240, and subsequent condemnation of the Talmud.  After the disputation a tribunal was appointed to pass judgment upon the Talmud, among its members being Eudes de Chateauroux, Chancellor of the University of Paris; Guillaume d'Auvergne, Bishop of Paris; and the Inquisitor Henri de Cologne. After the same rabbis had been heard a second time, the Talmud was condemned to be burned. Two years after (in the middle of 1242) twenty-four cartloads of Hebrew books were burned at Paris. In 1244/1245, Odo commissioned the Extractiones de Talmud, a translation of almost two thousand excerpts from the Talmud into Latin.

In 1247 the pope asked Odo to examine the Talmud from the Jewish standpoint, and to ascertain whether it might not be tolerated as harmless to the Christian faith, and whether the copies which had been confiscated might not be returned to their owners. The rabbis had represented to him that without the aid of the Talmud they could not understand the Bible or the rest of their statutes. Eudes informed the pope that the change of attitude involved in such a decision would be wrongly interpreted, and on 15 May 1248 the Talmud was condemned for the second time.  A long list of supposed "errors and blasphemies" contained the Talmud was compiled by Eudes de Chateauroux. He was made cardinal-bishop of Frascati (1244). He is given also as bishop of Toulouse and bishop of Maguelonne and legate, and was sent to preach crusade in France by Pope Innocent IV. He accompanied Louis IX of France on the Seventh Crusade, and is mentioned by Joinville, returning in 1254, via Cyprus. Dean of the Sacred College of Cardinals from December 1254 and Camerlengo of the Holy Roman Church in 1270.

He brought back relics, which he gave to Viterbo, Tournai and Neuvy-Saint-Sépulcre, Indre, France. He also consecrated relics in the Sainte-Chapelle. He led the enquiry into the canonization of Richard of Chichester. In 1270, on the death of Louis IX, he announced official mourning for the whole of Christendom.

He died on 25 January 1273 at Orvieto.

Works
 Super Psalterium
 MLXXVII Sermones de tempore et de sanctis et de diversis casibus

Notes

References

For a list of manuscripts containing Super Psalterium see « Eudes de Châteauroux » in Viller, Marcel. Dictionnaire de spiritualité. Paris : G. Beauchesnes et ses fils, 1937-1995. 4, 2 (1961) : 1675-8.

Further reading
Letter in August Potthast Regesta Pontificum Romanorum

 Iozzelli, F. (1989). "Il cardinal Odo da Chateauroux e Carlo d' Angio," Celestino V e i suoi tempi: realta spirituale e realta politica. Atti del 4° Convegno storico internazionale L'Aquila, 26-27 agosto 1989 (ed. W. Capezzali) (L'Aquila 1990). pp. 35–53.

External links

 Biography, under Ottone de Castro Rodolfi

1273 deaths
French Cistercians
13th-century French cardinals
Cardinal-bishops of Frascati
Scholastic philosophers
Deans of the College of Cardinals
Year of birth uncertain
Camerlengos of the Holy Roman Church
Christians of the Sixth Crusade
13th-century Italian Roman Catholic bishops
Christian anti-Judaism in the Middle Ages